J.H. Whittaker & Sons, Ltd (Whittaker's) is a confectionery manufacturer specialising in palm oil-free chocolate and based in Porirua, New Zealand. Whittaker's is the largest chocolate brand in New Zealand. Approximately 30% of their production is now exported. The company controls its entire manufacturing process in its facility in Porirua, identifying itself as a "bean-to-bar" manufacturer. James Henry Whittaker (1868–1947) started the business in Christchurch in 1896  and it was later moved to Wellington.

History

James Henry Whittaker (1868 – 1947) worked in the British confectionery industry from the age of 14 and moved to New Zealand with his wife Leah Alice in 1890. He was a salesman for Cadbury's chocolate before and after his move to New Zealand. In 1896 he started manufacturing chocolate confectionery, selling it directly to customers using horse and van. In 1913, he established a partnership with his two sons, Ronald and James, based in Wellington. The business became a limited liability company in 1937, with third-generation Whittakers still the sole shareholders in the company. In 1969 the company moved from Wellington to Porirua, because they needed more space and their premises at 167 Vivian Street were under threat from motorway development. The Peanut Slab was invented in the 1950s and Whittaker's began exporting it in 1985. In the 1970s and 80s they also produced Santé Bars, Toffee Milk Bars and K-Bars. The company began producing large blocks of chocolate in the 1990s. In 1992 the company formed J.H. Whittaker New Zealand Ltd.

The company has provided commercial sponsorship for motor sports in New Zealand as well as for the All Blacks.

The company's marketing phrases include "A passion for chocolate since 1896" and "Good honest chocolate" and also "from bean to bar". In 2011 it was listed as New Zealand's third most trusted brand by Bradley Colman survey. From 2012 to 2022 Whittaker's was voted New Zealand's most trusted brand, benefitting from Cadbury's 2009 bad publicity surrounding palm oil and changes in product size, and further fallout from Cadbury's closure of its Dunedin factory in 2017.

In May 2014, celebrity chef Nigella Lawson filmed an advert for Whittaker's in the 1930s Wellington railway station. Later, in 2022, Karl Urban appeared in an advert as a fictionalised time-travelling James Whittaker, right outside the same location.

In June 2014, Whittaker's expanded its market to Malaysia.

In 2014 Whittaker's set up a programme to support and improve cocoa bean production in Samoa, and in 2017 expanded the programme to include New Zealand's Ministry of Foreign Affairs and Trade. In 2019 Whittaker's admitted that while some bars have ethically sourced cocoa beans, the sugar is primarily sourced from Thailand. Thailand is known to have child labour in the sugar cane industry. In 2020 Whittaker's announced that its 116 products made with Ghanaian cocoa beans would now be 'Rainforest Alliance Certified'. The company also uses small amounts of beans from Samoa and Nicaragua. 

Apart from being named as New Zealand's most trusted brand, the company has won other awards including 'Exporter of the Year' at the 2021 ExportNZ ASB Wellington Export Awards and Supreme Award in the 2022 Wellington Gold Awards, which are awarded to recognise businesses in the Wellington region.

In August 2022 the company released an image of a chocolate bar wrapper which it produced for Māori Language Week, which has the chocolate variety 'Creamy Milk' written in Māori as 'Miraka Kirīmi'. The initiative was met with both praise and hostility from the public.

Singer Ed Sheeran visited New Zealand in February 2023 and said via Instagram that he liked New Zealand chocolate. Whittaker's responded by sending Sheeran a block of Creamy Milk with Sheeran's face on the label, calling it the 'Ed Block', then teamed up with Sheeran to auction signed t-shirts and a supply of chocolate to raise funds for victims of Auckland's severe flooding in late January.

See also
 List of bean-to-bar chocolate manufacturers

References

External links
 Whittaker's official website
 List and review of 52 varieties of Whittaker's family blocks, novelty bars and mini slabs

Chocolate companies
Food manufacturers of New Zealand
New Zealand confectionery
Food and drink companies established in 1896
New Zealand brands
New Zealand companies established in 1896